Mohammad Abdullah (born October 16, 1997) is an association football player from Sirajganj, Bangladesh and also plays as midfielder for Rahmatganj MFS and the Bangladesh national football team.

He was part of the Bangladesh national football team congregation that traveled to Bhutan to play the 2019 AFC Asian Cup qualification qualifier facing the Bhutan national football team.

Early life

Starting football at the age of six, Mohammad Abdullah's first match Bangabandhu Gold Cup primary school tournament in 2010.

Career
Dilkusha SC, a Dhaka Third Division club picked him after an eight-month training camp at the Bangladesh Football Federation academy, later transferring to Arambagh Krira Sangha before making the preliminary Bangladesh national football team roster.

He is a Bangladesh international.

He was in the 2022 World Cup squad.

References

Bangladeshi footballers
Bangladesh international footballers
Association football midfielders
Bangladesh youth international footballers
Living people
1997 births
People from Sirajganj District
Abahani Limited (Chittagong) players
Saif SC players
Sheikh Russel KC players
Rahmatganj MFS players
Bangladesh Football Premier League players
Footballers at the 2018 Asian Games
Asian Games competitors for Bangladesh